The following outline is provided as an overview of and topical guide to Kosovo, a territory in the Balkans. See also Kosovo (region).

General reference

 Pronunciation:
 Common English name: Kosovo
 Official English names:
Republic of Kosovo (proclaimed republic's claim; de facto)
Autonomous Province of Kosovo and Metohija (Serbia's claim)
See International recognition of Kosovo and Brussels Agreement (2013)

 Common endonym(s): Kosova (Albanian and Turkish); Kosovo (Serbian and Bosnian)
 Official endonym(s): 
Republika e Kosovës (Albanian)
Autonomna Pokrajina Kosovo i Metohija (Serbian)
 Adjectival:  Kosovar or Kosovan
 Demonym: Kosovar/Kosovan
 Etymology: Name of Kosovo
 International rankings of Kosovo

Geography of Kosovo

Geography of Kosovo
 Kosovo is: a landlocked territory
 Location:
 Eastern Hemisphere
 Northern Hemisphere
 Eurasia
 Europe
 Southern Europe
 Balkans (also known as "Southeastern Europe")
 Time zone:  Central European Time (UTC+01), Central European Summer Time (UTC+02)
 Extreme points of Kosovo
 High:  Velika Rudoka 
 Low:  White Drin 
 Land boundaries:  702 km
Serbia proper, 352 km
 159 km
 112 km
 79 km
 Coastline:  none
 Area of Kosovo: 10,908 km2
 Atlas of Kosovo

Environment of Kosovo

 Climate of Kosovo
 Renewable energy in Kosovo
 Geology of Kosovo
 Protected areas of Kosovo
 Biosphere reserves in Kosovo
 Wildlife of Kosovo
 Fauna of Kosovo
 Birds of Kosovo
 Mammals of Kosovo

Natural geographic features of Kosovo
 Forests of Kosovo
 Lakes of Kosovo
 Mountains of Kosovo

Regions of Kosovo

Regions of Kosovo

Ecoregions of Kosovo

List of ecoregions in Kosovo

Administrative divisions of Kosovo

Administrative divisions of Kosovo
 Subdivisions of Kosovo
 Municipalities of Kosovo

Subdivisions of Kosovo

Subdivisions of Kosovo

Municipalities of Kosovo

Municipalities of Kosovo
 Capital of Kosovo: Pristina
 Cities of Kosovo

Demography of Kosovo

Demographics of Kosovo

Government and politics of Kosovo 

 Form of government:
 Capital of Kosovo: Pristina
 Elections in Kosovo
 Kosovan elections
 2008 Kosovo declaration of independence
 1990 Kosovo declaration of independence
 International Court of Justice advisory opinion on Kosovo's declaration of independence
 Serbia's reaction to the 2008 Kosovo declaration of independence
 Political parties in Kosovo
 Supreme Court of Kosovo

Branches of the government of Kosovo 

Government of Kosovo

Executive branch of the government of Kosovo 
 Head of state: President of Kosovo, Vjosa Osmani (acting)
 Head of government: Prime Minister of Kosovo, Avdullah Hoti (acting)
 Cabinet of Kosovo
 United Nations Interim Administration Mission in Kosovo

Legislative branch of the government of Kosovo 

 Assembly of Kosovo (unicameral)

Foreign relations of Kosovo 

Foreign relations of Kosovo
 Diplomatic missions in Kosovo
 Diplomatic missions of Kosovo
 International recognition of Kosovo
 Serbia's reaction to the 2008 Kosovo declaration of independence

International organization membership 

International organization membership of Kosovo
1 Kosovo (UNMIK) membership

Membership of Kosovo in international sports federations

Law and order in Kosovo 
 Constitution of Kosovo
 Crime in Kosovo
 Human rights in Kosovo
 LGBT rights in Kosovo
 Sexual trafficking in Kosovo
 Freedom of religion in Kosovo
 Law enforcement in Kosovo
 European Union Rule of Law Mission in Kosovo
 2004 unrest in Kosovo
 2008 unrest in Kosovo

Military of Kosovo 

Military of Kosovo
 Command
 Commander-in-chief:
 Ministry of Defence of Kosovo
 Kosovo Security Forces
NATO's Kosovo Force (KFOR)
Kosovo Protection Corps (KPC)
 Military history of Kosovo
 Military ranks of Kosovo

Local government in Kosovo 

Subdivisions of Kosovo

History of Kosovo 

History of Kosovo
 Military history of Kosovo

Culture of Kosovo 

Culture of Kosovo
 Architecture of Kosovo
 Cuisine of Kosovo
 Festivals in Kosovo
 Languages of Kosovo
 Literature of Kosovo
 Media in Kosovo
 Symbols of Kosovo
 Coat of arms of Kosovo (proposed)
 Europe (anthem)
 Flag of Kosovo
 People of Kosovo
 Prostitution in Kosovo
 Public holidays in Kosovo
 Records of Kosovo
 Religion in Kosovo
 Christianity in Kosovo
 Hinduism in Kosovo
 Islam in Kosovo
 Judaism in Kosovo
 Sikhism in Kosovo

Art in Kosovo 
 Art in Kosovo
 Cinema of Kosovo
 Literature of Kosovo
 Music of Kosovo
 Radio in Kosovo
 Television in Kosovo
 Theatre in Kosovo

Sports in Kosovo 
 Football in Kosovo
Kosovo at the Olympics

Economy and infrastructure of Kosovo

Economy of Kosovo
 Economic rank, by nominal GDP (2007): Between 152nd and 153rd according to the CIA World Factbook figures
 Communications in Kosovo
 Companies of Kosovo
Currency of Kosovo: Euro (see also: Euro topics)
ISO 4217: EUR
 Kosovo Stock Exchange
 Tourism in Kosovo
 Transport in Kosovo
 Airports in Kosovo
 Rail transport in Kosovo

See also 

List of international rankings
Outline of Europe
Outline of geography
Outline of Serbia

References

External links

 United Nations Interim Administration in Kosovo
 The Government of Kosovo and Prime minister's office
 Assembly of Kosovo
 President of Kosovo
 Serbian Government for Kosovo and Metohija
 Kosovo. The World Factbook. Central Intelligence Agency.
 Visit Kosovo – Tourism Website

 
Kosovo
Kosovo